João Gilberto is a bossa nova album by João Gilberto, originally released in Brazil as a vinyl LP in 1973 and reissued on CD in 1988. João Gilberto released another album named João Gilberto in 1961, as well as several EPs with only his name as title. The minimal instrumentation – just Gilberto's guitar and voice, plus Sonny Carr's very sparse percussion – and the relentless beat give the album a hypnotic feel. The album's sound engineer was famous electronic music pioneer Wendy Carlos. This album is often referred to as João Gilberto's "white album", in a reference to The Beatles' White Album.

It was listed by Rolling Stone Brazil as 47th of the 100 best Brazilian albums in history.

Track listing

Personnel 
 João Gilberto – vocals, classical guitar
 Sonny Carr – percussion
 Miúcha – vocals (on "Izaura")

References

External links 
 
 Album Review (french)

1973 albums
João Gilberto albums